Aleurodiscus is a genus of corticioid fungi in the family Stereaceae.

Species

A. aberrans
A. abietis
A. amorphus
A. atlanticus
A. aurantius
A. australiensis
A. berggrenii
A. botryosus
A. canadensis
A. cerussatus
A. coralloides
A. coronatus
A. cremicolor
A. croceus
A. dendroideus
A. dextrinoideocerussatus
A. diffissus
A. disciformis
A. exasperatus
A. farlowii
A. fruticetorum
A. gigasporus
A. grantii
A. ilexicola
A. jacksonii
A. lapponicus
A. laurentianus
A. limonisporus
A. ljubarskii
A. macrocystidiatus
A. mesaverdensis
A. mirabilis
A. monilifer
A. oakesii
A. occidentalis
A. ochraceoflavus
A. parmuliformis
A. patelliformis
A. penicillatus
A. piceinus
A. roseoflavus
A. sparsus
A. spiniger
A. subglobosporus
A. succineus
A. taxicola
A. tenuis
A. thujae
A. utahensis
A. vitellinus
A. wakefieldiae
A. weirii
A. zealandicus

References

Russulales genera
Stereaceae
Taxa named by Joseph Schröter